The R324 road is a regional road in south central County Mayo in Ireland. It connects the N60 road near Balla to the R320 road near Kiltimagh.

The government legislation that defines the R324, the Roads Act 1993 (Classification of Regional Roads) Order 2012 (Statutory Instrument 54 of 2012), provides the following official description:

R324: Balla — Kiltimagh, County Mayo

Between its junction with N60 at Moat and its junction with R320 at Derryvohy via Craggagh and Ballinamore all in the county of Mayo.

See also
List of roads of County Mayo
National primary road
National secondary road
Regional road
Roads in Ireland

References

Regional roads in the Republic of Ireland
Roads in County Mayo